Muhammad Ehsan Ullah Khan (born in Gwadar, Balochistan, February 9, 1947) is the founder of the Bonded Labour Liberation Front (BLLF) of Pakistan, an organization that has freed more than 100,000 slaves in that country.

Khan was the founder and president of the Brick Kiln Workers Front, and BLLF Global, a human rights organization that opposes slavery and child slavery in Pakistan and South Asia. He is the national coordinator of Global March in Sweden.

In 1992 he freed Iqbal Masih, who was working in the carpet industry. On April 16, 1995 Iqbal was assassinated. His murder brought to light the work of campaigners against forced child labour.

Khan has raised slavery issues in the United Nations, through the Working Group for Contemporary Forms of Slavery and in the International Labour Organization (ILO).

Biography 
Ullah Khan studied journalism at Punjab University, in Lahore. While still a student, he began to organize brick kiln workers so that they rebelled against slavery. 
After meeting Babba Kaala he became aware of the drama of slavery in his country. His daughters had been kidnapped by the owner of the kiln on the pretext of not receiving the monthly instalment on the debt the old man had incurred.

Foundation of Bhatta Mazdor Mahaz
In September 1967 he formed Bhatta Mazdor Mahaz (BMM). The BMM was not only organizing actions and demonstrations of different kinds against the bonded system of labor, but it was also providing legal aid to give basic human rights to the bonded workers at the brick kilns for the first time in the history of South Asia. Forced labor was common among many other groups, like agriculture, carpet making, and mine workers.

In 1987, he mobilized some workers to present their cause to the Supreme Court of Justice. It was as a result of the pressure exerted by Ehsan and his movement that in 1988 a law declared peshgi (debt bondage system) illegal.

Iqbal Masih's liberation
It was the BLLF that freed Iqbal from slavery, as well as other 40,000 children in Pakistan, and it was Khan who put the fight against children slavery up for discussion once slavery had been abolished in his country, twenty years after he had started his abolitionist struggle.

Khan feels that non-violence is the best of paths. The importance of the role of children is emphasized in his development strategy, which is that "the victims should be empowered". Khan states that "those children, who get a basic education, knowledge about their rights, and hope for their future, will themselves eliminate the slavery".

Imprisonment and torture
Working as a journalist, Khan was arrested many times due to his activities for human rights and freedom of the press. In 1982 he was jailed for six months and confined in a dark cell in Lahore Fort during Zia ul Haq's dictatorship from 1978 to 1988. He was arrested and tortured after he had written an article about the genetic development of biological warfare germs in a government-controlled laboratory in Lahore. Because of the torture, he lost almost all his hearing from one ear. In an article, he denounced how bonded brick kiln workers had been used as guinea pigs and died due to experiments in a secret research project. The charge against him was high treason, which carried the death penalty.

In December 1994, he accompanies Iqbal to the United States to receive an International Award in Boston, Massachusetts. They visited Broad Meadows Middle School in Quincy, where after Iqbal's murder, some students started a campaign to raise money for a school in Pakistan, that opened in February 1997 with the support of tens of thousands of children from all 50 states of the United States.

Exile
Khan has been in exile in Europe since April 16, 1995, after the murder of Iqbal Masih. Since he was forced to stay in Europe, he founded  BLLF Global in 1996, to fight against slavery and child slavery all over the world. Although his intention is to return to Pakistan and continue his work with his organization. He applies for a visa every year at the embassy, but it is repeatedly denied. The sedition case was quashed in Lahore High Court on November 28, 2001, when the judge declared that the case was unlawful and the allegation was false. However, the Pakistani government still does not allow him to return to Pakistan.

As Kailash Satyarthi, Peace Nobel Prize 2014, said about Ullah Khan, on May 7, 2015:

I am proud to have so many good friends; some of them are just like family members. Ranging from Ehsan Ullah Khan, the great pioneer in the history of the movement against bonded labor and child labor in Pakistan.

In May 2014 he attended the First International Congress on Combating Unemployment, Exploitation and Slavery, organized by the SAIn political Party (Solidarity, Self-Management and Internationalism) in Spain. The Congress Breaking Chains brought together for four days activists from several organizations that promote the fight against injustice from non-violence. Organized by party SAIn, hosted more than 220 congressmen come from different parts of the Spain and with speakers from four continents. Experiences as Ekta Parishad in India, the Foundation La Alameda in Argentina or the Bonded Labour Liberation Front in Pakistan were very present.
During this time in Spain he appeared in several media as an interview at the Cadena SER of Santiago de Compostela. Hoy por hoy, another one to the rtvg -galician television- or at the local TV, Santiago TeVe. He also visited many schools as IES Antón Fraguas, La Salle de Santiago and the Parroquia mártires de Uganda, at the barrio Milagrosa in Pamplona.
		
He asked to have a meeting with the owner of INDITEX and he had an encounter with Aleix González and Indalecio Pérez from CSR (Corporate Social Responsibility) of the enterprise.

April 2016 Ehsan had a great presence in the Canary Islands. He gave speeches in many High Schools (Instituto de Jimanar, Instituto La Rocha, Instituto Santa Brígida, Instituto Tomás Morales). Antonio Morales, Gran Canary Cabildo President, held a reception to Ehsan Ullah Khan, at the Cabildo Headquarters. Carmen Hernández, Telde Mayor; The Society of mayors of the North of Gran Canariaheld; Dunia González, Mayor of Santa Lucía held him receptions and also, an Iqbal Masih tribute act with students from the Telde High Schools, at the San Juan park next to the Iqbal Masih monument.

He participated at the ESPAL (Encuentro de Solidaridad con los Pueblos de África y Latinoamérica -Latin América and Africa People Solidarity Meeting-) activities.

In April 7, 2017 he had a meeting with Martiño Noriega, mayor of Santiago de Compostela, to discuss how to deal the collaboration of our society with an exploitative economic system. That days in Santiago he also participated in a three days  workshop on documentarism and non violent action against  exploitation on garment industry.

He had a meeting in May 2018 with Vitoria's Bishop, Juan Carlos Elizalde, who wrote him a recommendation letter to other Bishops, in order to open their Dioceses to his testimony.

In April 16, 2018 the vice-rector for Academic Policy and Social Participation, Enrique Cabero, at the Rectorate of the University of Salamanca receives Ehsan Ullah Khan on the occasion of the commemoration of Child Slavery Day.

In June 12, 2019, he is interviewed on Spanish Radio and Television (rtve).

References

External links 
Ehsan Ulla Khan, militante del Frente de Liberación del Trabajo Forzado
Entrevista en Hoy por hoy Santiago de la Cadena SER
Kailash Satyarthi y Ehsan Ullah Khan en Galicia

Pakistani activists
Pakistani trade union leaders
1947 births
Living people
People from Balochistan, Pakistan
Pakistani journalists